Statistics of Qatar Stars League for the 1966–67 season.

Overview
Al-Oruba won the championship.

References
Qatar - List of final tables (RSSSF)

Qatar Stars League seasons
Qatar
football